S15, SB15, SM15 are disability swimming classifications used for categorising swimmers based on their level of disability. These classifications are for athletes with hearing loss.

Definition
The S15, SB15 and SM15 classifications are for people with hearing loss.

The classification was created by the International Paralympic Committee  and has roots in a 2003 attempt to address "the overall objective to support and co-ordinate the ongoing development of accurate, reliable, consistent and credible sport focused classification systems and their implementation."

In Australia, to be classified in this category, athletes contact the Australian Paralympic Committee or their state swimming governing body.

See also

 Para-swimming classification
 Swimming at the Summer Paralympics

References

Swimming at the Summer Paralympics
Parasports classifications